A pargeter as a craftsman employed in pargeting

Pargeter may also refer to:

Edith Pargeter (1913–1995) (nom de plume Ellis Peters), English author of works in many categories, especially history and historical fiction
Lucy Pargeter (born 1977), English television actress
Alison Pargeter, English television, film, stage and radio actress
Margaret Pargeter, nom de plume for a popular writer of romance novels from 1975 to 1986
William Pargeter (1760–1810), Eighteenth-century physician in England with an interest in mental illness.

Fictional characters 
 A family in The Archers, a radio soap opera